Monkwearmouth Railway Station is former station that served Monkwearmouth, Sunderland, England, from 1848 to 1967. It was built in 1848 to a design by Thomas Moore. and was once the main railway station in the city. The railway station closed in March 1967 and featured a restored booking office dating from the Edwardian period. The station was opened as a museum in 1973.

The Tyne and Wear Metro and mainline trains still pass through the station without stopping, but the Metro calls at St. Peter's station a few hundred yards south of the old station, due to the platforms at Monkwearmouth being too narrow to serve as a Metro station.

The former station is a Grade II* listed building.  As well as the ticket office, visitors could explore the Wagon Shed, Journeys Gallery and Children's Gallery.

The museum was temporarily closed from August 2005 until 2007 to allow repairs and refurbishment to take place.

The museum was closed on 23 May 2017 because the roof, footbridge and platforms were claimed to be in a very poor condition, despite a major two-year refurbishment programme in 2005–07. The station has since reopened as the Fans Museum, which houses a collection of football memorabilia from Sunderland and around the world. The museum was closed in March 2020 during the COVID-19 pandemic but reopened in August 2021.

References

External links
Monkwearmouth Station Museum - official site.

Disused railway stations in Tyne and Wear
Museums sponsored by the Department for Digital, Culture, Media and Sport
Grade II* listed buildings in Tyne and Wear
Grade II* listed railway stations
Museums in the City of Sunderland
Railway stations in Great Britain opened in 1848
Railway stations in Great Britain closed in 1967
Former North Eastern Railway (UK) stations
Sunderland